(1861 – 1939), also known as  or O'Tama Chiovara, or  was a Japanese painter who spent most of her life in the Sicilian city of Palermo.

Biography
Kiyohara Tamayo was the second daughter of Kiyohara Einosuke, manager of the famous Zōjō-ji temple in Shiba-Shinbori, Minato, Tokyo, Japan. She started seriously studying painting with a Japanese master even before entering elementary school. Her life suddenly changed when Sicilian sculptor Vincenzo Ragusa, for whom she had modeled when she was just 17, after spending six years in Japan as a sculpture professor decided to go home in 1882 bringing with him Kiyohara Einosuke, Kiyohara's wife and 21-year-old Tamayo.

In Palermo, Ragusa opened the Scuola Superiore d'Arte Applicata, employing Kiyohara and his wife as instructors to introduce Japanese lacquer techniques to Italy, but difficulties in obtaining the necessary raw materials caused the school's closure, and Kiyohara and his wife returned to Japan after six years in Palermo. They left behind their daughter Tamayo, who married Ragusa in 1889, and adopted the Italian name of Eleonora Ragusa.

She continued to be active in the arts and was nominated vice-principal of an art school Vincenzo opened in Palermo. The school, called “Museo Artistico Industriale, Scuole Officine”, was opened in 1884 with public funds in Palazzo Belvedere (Casa Benzo). He headed the male section, she the female section. The school still exists under the name of Istituto d'Arte di Palermo.

In Italy, she was admired for her works in watercolor, including still-lives with flowers, but also figures and landscapes. She won many prizes in the exhibitions in the Casino of Fine Arts of Palermo.  She also excelled in embroidery, winning a gold medal for her work at an exhibition in Rome.

After her husband's death in 1927, two Japanese newspapers, the Osaka Mainichi Shinbun and the Tokyo Nichinichi Shinbun, found out about her story and published a serialized novel about it, bringing Tamayo to fame in her homeland. By then she could barely speak Japanese anymore, but she decided to go back. After her return, she opened an atelier in Shiba Shinbori, where she died some years later. She is buried at her family temple, Chōgen-ji. Kiyohara was herself a painter of great skill, but most of the works she left in Japan were destroyed during World War II, while those left in Italy are still exhibited in various private collections.

According to her wishes, half of her ashes are in Japan, and half lie in Palermo next to her husband's grave.

In popular culture 
Tama features in the 2018 novel The Death of Noah Glass by Australian author Gail Jones, in which the eponymous character is accused of being involved in the theft and smuggling of a sculpture of Eleonora by Vincenzo Ragusa.

Notes

References 
 Vincenzo Ragusa and his work , National Research Institute for Cultural Properties, Tokyo, retrieved on July 10, 2008
  Meiji Sandai Kokusai Romansu, Urayasu News, retrieved on July 10, 2008
  Chōgen-ji temple site, article about Kiyohara Tama, retrieved on July 10, 2008
 Tama Ragusa, from Prominent People of Minato City, retrieved on July 10, 2008
  Ragusa Tama retrieved on July 10, 2008
  Storia, Scuola Media Annessa all'Istituto d'Arte di Palermo, retrieved on July 10, 2008.

External links 

  Vincenzo Ragusa — Bust of Kiyohara Tama.
  Kiyohara Tama — Self-portrait
  Vincenzo Ragusa — Bust of Kiyohara Tama
 (in English) Eleonora Ragusa or O'Tama Kiyohara: Japanese Painter in Sicily

1861 births
1939 deaths
Japanese painters
19th-century Italian painters
20th-century Italian painters
Painters from Palermo
Italian women painters
Japanese women artists
20th-century Japanese women artists
19th-century women artists
Japanese artists' models
Japanese expatriates in Italy
Artists from Tokyo
20th-century Italian women